Akharman is a village in the Görele district of Giresun Province.

Geography 
It is 75 km away from Giresun province and 11 km away from Görele district.

Village population data by years

References

External links 

 Website

Villages in Giresun Province
Görele District